The Burnstone mine is one of the largest gold mines in the South Africa and in the world. The mine is located in the north-east of the country in Gauteng. The mine has estimated reserves of 29.1 million oz of gold.

References 

Gold mines in South Africa
Economy of Gauteng